The Eastern Wabash Valley Conference was a short-lived IHSAA-sanctioned conference located in Northeast Indiana. The league started in 1959, as five schools broke away from the Eastern Indiana Conference and joined with Wells County Conference member Ossian. This lineup lasted only three years, as Berne would return to the EIC in 1962. The remaining five schools stuck together until 1966, as Geneva high school closed. Lancaster Central, Monmouth, and Ossian were all slated to close that next year, so the remaining four schools went their separate ways. Adams Central (already an Allen County Athletic Conference member) would be joined by Ossian (holding the place for the new Norwell consolidation) in the ACAC, while Lancaster and Monmouth would play out their last season by returning to the EIC.

Membership 

 Adams Central played in both the EWVC and ACAC for the 1965-66 school year.
 Lancaster Central played concurrently in the EWVC and WCC for their entire EWVC duration. Both conferences folded in 1966.

References 

Indiana high school athletic conferences
High school sports conferences and leagues in the United States
Indiana High School Athletic Association disestablished conferences